Joachim Heer (25 September 1825 – 1 March 1879) was a Swiss politician and member of the Swiss Federal Council (1875–1878).

He was elected to the Swiss Federal Council on 10 December 1875 and handed over office on 31 December 1878. He was affiliated to the Free Democratic Party of Switzerland. During his office time he held the following departments:
 Department of Posts and Telegraph (1876)
 Political Department (1877)
 Department of Railway and Trade (1878)

He was President of the Confederation in 1877.

Dr. Joachim-Heer-Strasse in Glarus is named for him.

External links

1825 births
1879 deaths
People from Glarus
Swiss Calvinist and Reformed Christians
Free Democratic Party of Switzerland politicians
Foreign ministers of Switzerland
Members of the Federal Council (Switzerland)
Members of the National Council (Switzerland)
Presidents of the National Council (Switzerland)
Ambassadors of Switzerland to Germany
University of Zurich alumni